This list of earthquakes in Tajikistan, is a list of notable earthquakes that have affected the area currently defined as Tajikistan.

Earthquakes

See also
Geology of Tajikistan

References

Sources

Tajikistan
Earthquakes in Tajikistan
Earthquakes
Earthquakes